Joko Anwar (born 3 January 1976) is an Indonesian film director, producer, screenwriter, and actor.

Anwar first rose to prominence for co-writing Nia Dinata's 2003 hit Arisan! which won five awards at the 2004 Citra Award. He then made his feature film directorial debut with the romantic comedy Joni's Promise in 2005, gaining a Best Director nomination at the 2005 Citra Award. He has since directed a wide range of genres: the noir thriller Dead Time: Kala (2007), psychological thriller The Forbidden Door (2009), supernatural horror Satan's Slaves (2017), and live-action superhero Gundala (2019).

Anwar has won three Citra Awards out of 11 nominations for directing and screenwriting. He won the Best Director Awards twice: in 2015 for the urban drama A Copy of My Mind and in 2020 for the folk horror Impetigore as well as the Best Screenplay Award in 2008 for co-writing Mouly Surya's Fiksi.. He has also been nominated for a total of 7 Maya Awards, winning Best Director for Satan's Slaves in 2017.

Asian Television Awards

Bandung Film Festival

Bangkok International Film Festival

Bucheon International Fantastic Film Festival

Cinepocalypse

Citra Awards

Fantasporto

Oslo Films from the South Festival

Five Flavours Film Festival

Indonesian Box Office Movie Awards

Jogja-NETPAC Asian Film Festival

Maya Awards

Molins Film Festival

MTV Indonesia Movie Awards

South by Southwest

Tempo Film Festival

Venice International Film Festival

Vesoul Asian Film Festival

References

External links 

 

Anwar, Joko